Playing Mona Lisa is a 2000 comedy film directed by Matthew Huffman and starring Alicia Witt, Harvey Fierstein, Johnny Galecki, Elliott Gould, Marlo Thomas, Molly Hagan and Brooke Langton. It is based on a play by Marni Freedman.

Plot
Everything goes wrong all at once in gifted 23-year-old pianist Claire Goldstein's life. San Francisco has an earthquake, she loses her apartment, her boyfriend Jeremy dumps her and she misses out on an important piano competition.

Claire is forced to move home with her parents (Marlo Thomas, Elliott Gould), where sister Jenine (Molly Hagan) is busy planning a wedding. Claire's mom is into the occult, her teacher (Harvey Fierstein) tries to arrange auditions and friends try to hook her up with a new romantic prospect, Eddie, adding to the complications in her life.

Cast

Production

Development and writing
Based on Marni Freedman's play Two Goldsteins on Acid.

Filming
Shot in San Francisco in the spring of 1999.

Musical score
Composed by Carlos Rodriguez the film's score includes a variety of music.  From contemporary songs to classical piano, salsa, and polka.

Release
Released in San Francisco October 27, 2000.

Marketing
Shown at Gen Art Film Festival in New York City April 26 - May 2, 2000.

Shown at Stony Brook Film Festival July 19–29, 2000.

Shown at U.S. Comedy Arts Festival in Aspen, Colorado February 9–13, 2000.

Reception
Fresh rating of 62% from Rotten Tomatoes.

Awards
Won Audience Choice Award for Best Feature in 2000 at the Stony Brook Film Festival.

Won Film Discovery Jury Award for Best Actor Alicia Witt in 2000 at U.S. Comedy Arts Festival.

Home media
The DVD for the film was released on April 17, 2001.

See also

Notes

External links
 
 
 

2000 films
2000 comedy films
Films set in San Francisco
American comedy films
Touchstone Pictures films
2000s English-language films
2000s American films